The St. Petersburg Woman's Club is a historic woman's club in St. Petersburg, Florida. It is located at 40 Snell Isle Boulevard. On July 15, 1994, it was added to the U.S. National Register of Historic Places.

History
The St. Petersburg Woman's Club began on  February 7, 1913, by Mrs. Benjamin A. Greene who moved from Evanston, Illinois where she served as the president of her Federated Woman's Club. Mrs. Greene was the president and the club met every Thursday afternoon at 3pm at the First Baptist Church. The club joined the Florida Federation of Women's Clubs in 1913.

In 1921, Mrs. Esterly became the Honorary President for life. The club motto was “Each for all and all for humanity. We cannot all serve alike but we can all serve willingly and well.” A building fund was first established in 1922 and membership grew to 400 by January 1923. On November 26, 1923, the  St. Petersburg Woman's Club officially became a member of the General Federation of Women's Clubs.

The clubhouse dedication took place in November 1929 and in April 1932 twelve young women started the Junior Woman's Club as an auxiliary of the Senior Woman's Club.

See also
List of Registered Historic Woman's Clubhouses in Florida

References

External links
 Pinellas County listings at National Register of Historic Places
 Florida's Office of Cultural and Historical Programs
 Pinellas County listings
 St. Petersburg Woman's Club
 St. Petersburg Woman's Club

National Register of Historic Places in Pinellas County, Florida
Buildings and structures in St. Petersburg, Florida
Women's clubs in Florida
Women's club buildings in Florida
Organizations established in 1913
1913 establishments in Florida
Buildings and structures completed in 1929